Jenniphr Goodman is a film director best known for directing and co-writing the 2000 film The Tao of Steve.

She received her B.A. in creative writing and film making in 1984 through Pitzer College. She is also a graduate of New York University's film school at the Tisch School of the Arts.

References

External links
 

Year of birth missing (living people)
Living people
American women film directors
Tisch School of the Arts alumni
Pitzer College alumni